The 29th Michigan Infantry Regiment was an infantry regiment that served in the Union Army during the American Civil War.

Service
The 29th Michigan Infantry was mustered into Federal service at East Saginaw, Michigan, on October 3, 1864.  Among the volunteers was future Michigan state politician Edward P. Allen.

The regiment was mustered out of service on September 12, 1865.

Total strength and casualties
The regiment suffered 1 officer and 5 killed in action or mortally wounded and 1 officer and 65 enlisted men who died of disease, for a total of 72
fatalities.

Commanders
Colonel

See also
List of Michigan Civil War Units
Michigan in the American Civil War

Notes

References
The Civil War Archive

Units and formations of the Union Army from Michigan
1865 disestablishments in Michigan
Military units and formations disestablished in 1865
1864 establishments in Michigan
Military units and formations established in 1864
Military units and formations disestablished in 1866